Justine Johnston (June 13, 1921January 13, 2006) was an American film, television, and musical theatre actress.

Life and career
Johnston was born in Evanston, Illinois. She was occasionally mistaken for Justine Johnstone, a similarly named silent film actress, who is not her mother and with whom she had no connection. Johnston performed throughout the Mid-Pacific during World War II. She appeared on Broadway in such musicals as the original production of the Tony-winning Follies (by Stephen Sondheim), as well as the American production of Me and My Girl, and a revival of Irene, starring Debbie Reynolds.

Some film audiences remember her as Aunt Pearl in the classic comedy Arthur (1981).

Johnston served on the governing body of the Actors' Equity Association for 39 years. She died of a stroke in West Hollywood, aged 84, in 2006.

Filmography

References

External links

1921 births
2006 deaths
American film actresses
American musical theatre actresses
American television actresses
Actresses from Evanston, Illinois
Singers from Chicago
20th-century American actresses
20th-century American singers
20th-century American women singers
21st-century American women